Miss Gayatri Shah (born c. 1982) is the youngest member of the current Constituent Assembly of Nepal out of 601 in total. She is a member of Janata Dal. She is also a member of the Youth Advisory Panel for the United Nations in Nepal. Shah entered politics after completing a Masters in Political Science.

References

Janata Dal (Samajbadi Prajatantrik) politicians
1980s births
Living people
Members of the 1st Nepalese Constituent Assembly